Privilege of Evil is an EP by the Finnish metal band Amorphis released in 1993. It is a collection of demo material from Amorphis' early career recorded in Timo Tolkki's (Stratovarius) TTT Studio in 1991. At that time only two of these songs were picked for the band's first 7" single, but the full session was released two years later on this EP. On the EP's reissue by Relapse Records, the band became upset to hear that their early material was released. The material on this EP was originally meant to be for a split album with Incantation, which never materialized.  Incantation's half of the split would only be released individually sixteen years later as the Blasphemous Cremation EP.

Track listing

Personnel

Amorphis 
Tomi Koivusaari – vocals, rhythm guitar
Esa Holopainen – lead guitar
Olli-Pekka Laine – bass guitar
Jan Rechberger – drums, synthesizer

Guest 
Jukka Kolehmainen – vocals on "Vulgar Necrolatry"

Production 
Arranged and produced by Amorphis
Recorded, engineered and mixed by Timo Tolkki

References 

1993 debut EPs
Amorphis albums
Relapse Records EPs